During the 1987–88 English football season, Leicester City F.C. competed in the Football League Second Division.

Season summary
Leicester started the season poorly with five defeats from their first six league games, which put manager Hamilton under real pressure. He signed strikers Jari Rantanen from IFK Göteborg and Mike Newell from Luton Town for a club record £350,000 to make prospects a little brighter, but two wins in eleven league games cost Hamilton his job in December. He was replaced by former Tottenham Hotspur manager David Pleat, and fortunes turned in the second half of the season, with Leicester losing only four league games during that period and scoring in each of their final sixteen league fixtures.

Final league table

Results
Leicester City's score comes first

Legend

Football League Second Division

FA Cup

League Cup

Full Members Cup

Squad

References

Leicester City F.C. seasons
Leicester City